Elachista nucula is a moth of the family Elachistidae that is found in Colorado and Utah.

The ground colour of the forewings is white with a few greyish brown scales forming an indistinct spot in the middle of the wing at the fold and another at 2/3 of the wing. The hindwings are light yellowish grey and translucent. The underside of the wings is brownish grey.

Etymology
The species name is derived from Latin nucula (meaning kernel).

References

Moths described in 1997
nucula
Endemic fauna of the United States
Moths of North America